Typha lugdunensis is a plant species found in an odd disjunct distribution in Europe and Asia. It has been reported from Germany, Switzerland, France, Iran, Iraq, Turkey, and China (Hebei, Nei Mongol, Shandong, Xinjiang). The species grows in freshwater marshes.

References

lugdunensis
Freshwater plants
Flora of Germany
Flora of Switzerland
Flora of France
Flora of Iraq
Flora of Turkey
Flora of China
Flora of Hebei
Flora of Inner Mongolia
Flora of Shandong
Flora of Xinjiang
Plants described in 1850